Potito Starace and Adrian Ungur won the title, beating František Čermák and Lukáš Dlouhý 6–2, 6–4

Seeds

  František Čermák /  Lukáš Dlouhý (final)
  Ken Skupski /  Neal Skupski (quarterfinals)
  Frank Moser /  Alexander Satschko (semifinals)
  Lee Hsin-han /  Alessandro Motti (semifinals)

Draw

Draw

References
 Main Draw

Internazionali di Tennis del Friuli Venezia Giulia - Doubles
2014 Doubles
Friuli